Chullunkhäni (Aymara chullunkhä ('ä' stands for a long 'a') icicle, -ni a suffix, "the one with icicles", also spelled Chulluncani) is a  mountain in the Bolivian Andes. It is located in the Chuquisaca Department, Azurduy Province, Tarvita Municipality, and in the Jaime Zudáñez Province, Icla Municipality.

References 

Mountains of Chuquisaca Department